Goggia gemmula, also known as the Richtersveld dwarf leaf-toed gecko or the Richtersveld pygmy gecko,  is a species of gecko. It is found in South Africa and Namibia.

References

Goggia
Reptiles described in 1996
Reptiles of Namibia
Reptiles of South Africa
Taxa named by William Roy Branch